American Smooth is a poetry book by Rita Dove.

Contents
 All souls
 "I have been a stranger in a strange land"
 Fox trot Fridays
 Ta ta cha cha
 Quick
 Brown
 Fox
 Heart to heart
 Cozy apologia
 Soprano
 Two for the Montrose drive-in
 Meditation at fifty yards, moving target
 American smooth 
 The castle walk
 The passage
 Noble sissle's horn
 Alfonzo prepares to go over the top
 La Chapelle. 92nd Division. Ted
 Variation on reclamation
 The return of Lieutenant James Reese Europe
 Ripont
 Chocolate
 Bolero
 Hattie McDaniel arrives at the coconut grove
 Samba summer
 Blues in half-tones, 3/4 time
 Describe yourself in three words or less
 The seven veils of Salomé
 From your valentine
 Rhumba
 The sisters: swansong.
 Evening primrose
 Reverie in open air
 Sic itur ad astra
 Count to ten and we'll be there
 Eliza, age 10, Harlem
 Lullaby
 Driving through
 Desert backyard
 Desk dreams
 Now
 Against flight
 Looking up from the page, I am reminded of this mortal coil.

Reviews

References

2004 poetry books
American poetry collections